PT Tokopedia is an Indonesian e-commerce company. Tokopedia is a subsidiary of a new holding company called GoTo, following a merger with Gojek on 17 May 2021. It is one of the most visited e-commerce platforms in Indonesia.

Tokopedia is one of Indonesia's unicorn companies, alongside Bukalapak, Gojek, OVO, and Traveloka.

As of December 2020, Tokopedia claims to have more than 350 million product listings and 42 digital products, and serves over 100 million monthly active users as well as over 9.7 million merchants on its platform.

History 
William Tanuwijaya and Leontinus Alpha Edison came up with the idea for Tokopedia in 2007. While reflecting on his childhood experience, Tanuwijaya realized that access to products such as books differed between small towns and big cities, and that technology could provide better access to products. The duo launched Tokopedia two years later with starting capital from an acquaintance.

Toko is Indonesian for "shop", and is the first half of the portmanteau of the company's name, concatenated with "encyclopedia". The choice of this designation is to reflect their objective of becoming an all-encompassing marketplace for Indonesians. Tokopedia has since expanded its business to cover the fintech, payments, logistics, and retail sectors.

Since 2017, Tokopedia's office resides in a 53-floor building called the Tokopedia Tower, located in the central business district of Jakarta.

As of 2018, it is claimed that Tokopedia's products and services are accessible in 93% of sub-districts across Indonesia.

Finance 
In 2009, Tokopedia received seed funding from PT Indonusa Dwitama of IDR 2.5 billion. Tokopedia later attracted capital injections from venture capitalists including East Ventures (in 2010), CyberAgent Ventures (in 2011), NetPrice (in 2012), and SoftBank Ventures Korea (in 2013).

In October 2014, Tokopedia became the first technology company in Southeast Asia to receive a US$100 million investment, led by Sequoia Capital and SoftBank Internet and Media Inc (SIMI).

In April 2016, Tokopedia raised another US$147 million. A year later, it received US$1.1 billion in a new round of investment, led by Chinese e-commerce giant Alibaba Group. In 2018, an additional US$1.1 billion was injected into the company, in a round led by existing investors Alibaba and SoftBank, raising the company's valuation to approximately US$7 billion.

Products and services 

Tokopedia provides a customer-to-customer (C2C) platform that is free to use for merchants and buyers. Brands operating on a business-to-customer (B2C) basis have the option to set up verified, official stores on the platform too. Products listed on Tokopedia vary widely across at least 25 categories, ranging from food and beverages to beauty and fashion products, and more.

Tokopedia also offers digital products such as credit, bill payments, voucher and ticket purchases, and others.

In 2018, Tokopedia launched Mitra Tokopedia to offer fintech solutions such as digital wallets (e-wallets), virtual credit cards, insurance, and more. Mitra is targeted at small business owners such as grocery stores and family-owned warungs.

In 2019, Tokopedia launched a smart fulfilment service called TokoCabang, which helps sellers to expand their business across Indonesia. Tokopedia Salam was launched not long after—a service that supports Sharia market needs in Indonesia by providing Umrah services. Users can also purchase a variety of Muslim-friendly products and services through Salam. Sharia-compliant payment methods and investment products are also available on Tokopedia's platform.

Controversies 
Tokopedia suffered a data breach on 2 May 2020, when the personal information of 15 million users were hacked, including their gender, locations, usernames, full names, email addresses, phone numbers, and hashed passwords. The hacker, under the pseudonym ShinyHunters, put up the entire database purported to have 91 million records for sale at a price of US$5,000.

Marketing

Brand ambassadors 
Since 2020, Tokopedia has engaged renowned artists and celebrities to be its brand ambassadors, such as K-pop idol groups BTS, Blackpink, and Twice, among others.

Slogans 

 2009–2014 :  (Safe and Convenient Online Shopping)
 2014–2015 :  (More Complete, Cheaper, Safer)
 2014–2017 :  (Have You Checked Tokopedia Yet?)
 2015–2017 :  (Create Your Opportunities)
 2017–2019 :  (Everything Starts with Tokopedia)
 2018–2020 :  (Just Start)
 2020–present :  (Always Available, Always Possible)

Television shows 
 Tokopedia Untuk Indonesia #MulaiAjaDulu (English: For Indonesia, Just Start, Broadcast together with 15 Indonesian National TV Stations)
 Tokopedia Semarak Ramadhan Extra (RCTI, MNCTV, SCTV, NET & Trans7)
 Tokopedia WIB TV Show (RCTI, SCTV, Indosiar, NET & Trans7)

See also
List of unicorn startup companies

References

External links

 Official website

GoTo Indonesia
Companies based in Jakarta
Indonesian brands
Retail companies established in 2009
Internet properties established in 2009
Online marketplaces of Indonesia
Softbank portfolio companies
Indonesian companies established in 2009
2021 mergers and acquisitions